Hans Andersen Barlien (29 February 1772 – 31 October 1842) was a Norwegian farmer and politician. He has been credited with the establishment of a Norwegian-American immigrant settlement in Sugar Creek, Iowa.

Personal life
Barlien was born in Overhalla, Nord-Trøndelag 29 February 1772 to Anders Sørensen and Ane Hansdatter. On 24 November 1793 he married Kjerstine Einarsdatter Skistad (b. 1768) in Overhalla, daughter of Einar Skistad and Marie Sophie Christensdatter (1808–1897) in Sugar Creek, Iowa. Barlien was grandfather to Norwegian engineer Albert Fenger-Krog (1835–1904) and Norwegian politician Hans Konrad Foosnæs (1846–1917).

Early career
At the same time as his 1793 marriage, Barlien took over one of the Barli farms of Trondheim Cathedral. The parish priest Hans Blytt (1758–1805), together with Barlien, was the very first to provide vaccinations against smallpox in Norway. Blytt had imported lymph from Copenhagen and vaccinated first his own children, then members of the Barlien family.

In May 1804 Hans Barlien moved with his wife and four children to Trondheim, where he bought a pottery located on Prinsens gate. He was later licensed as a watchmaker. Barlien was eager to improve the city's water supply, and initiated  a new pump station and glass works on the farm Surviken, working together with  Haugeans Otto Carlsen  and Paul Anziøn. Barlien received the Dannebrogmændenes Hæderstegn on 28 June 1809 for his technological competence and skill. In 1812 Barlien bought the farm Ågård  in Namdalseid for 7000 Norwegian rigsdaler, where he built and experimented with a gliding aircraft.

Political career
Barlien entered politics in 1814. He did not become a member of the Constituent Assembly, but was elected as a representative from Nord-Trøndelag during the session 1815–1816 which became his only term in office. He was the only politician with farmer background who was represented in Lagtinget. The regulation of Norway's monetary system was the most important political issue that the Parliament dealt with in the 1815–16 period, and Barlien gave his point of view in a publication named Anmærkninger betræffende Pengevæsenet. En Nationalsag. Barlien wanted to maintain the Eidsvoll Warranty, claiming that "each citizen of the state, should, in relation to fortune, participate in the compliance of the Warranty".

He was not reelected in the 1818 election. His liberal political and religious views had often put him at odds with both the clergy and the establishment. He could not run in 1820 or 1824 because of an ongoing trial against him. In an article in the periodical Det norske Nationalblad, Barlien presented his views on Norwegian constitutional law and his experiences as an MP. In that article, Barlien stated that the Norwegian people were the "producing and fabricating part of the state members".

Immigration and legacy
In the year 1837 Hans Barlien emigrated from Norway to the United States. In June 1837 Barlien traveled to the United States aboard the ship Enigheden from Stavanger arriving about the middle of September, 1837. He subsequently visited the Fox River settlement of Norwegian immigrants in La Salle County, Illinois. In 1838 he lived in St. Louis, Missouri and in late 1839 or early 1840, Hans Barlien is attributed with being the founder of the first Norwegian immigrant settlement in the state of Iowa, at Sugar Creek in Lee County. On 31 October 1842 he died in Sugar Creek, Iowa.

In 1891, a memorial obelisk in honor of Hans Barlien was erected in Overhalla near Namsos. The street Hans Barliens gate in Oslo is named for Hans Barlien.

Publications
 Anmerkninger betræffende Pengevæsenet. En Nationalsag, 1815
 Om Norriges Grundlov, Repræsentation og Valgene, in Det norske Nationalblad, hf. 7, pp. 232–8
 Bemærkninger til Norges Grundlov, Overgaard (Årgård) 1830
 Melkeveien, 4 no., Overgård 1830
 Bemærkninger til det nye Lovudkast dat. 31. Oct. 1831, Trondheim 1833

Notes

References

Other sources
Flom, George T. (1909) A History of Norwegian Immigration to the United States  (Iowa City, Ia.) 
Norlie, Olaf M. (1925) History of the Norwegian People in America (Minneapolis, MN: Augsburg Publishing House)

1772 births
1842 deaths
19th-century Norwegian politicians
Norwegian farmers
Members of the Storting
People from Overhalla
Norwegian emigrants to the United States